Yuri Krasny (Russian: Красный Юрий Евсеевич, born 1946 in Dnipropetrovsk, Ukraine) is one of the USSR's pioneering media education theorists.

Biography 
In his childhood, Yuri suffered from a heavy form of rheumatism in his childhood.

In 1974, graduated from the Dnipropetrovsk Transport Engineering Institute; invested much time into self-education in humanities while living an artistic life of the dissident kind.

Married to Lina Kurdyukova. Upon discovery of amator filmmaking, they worked for more than 15 years in the Dnipropetrovsk animation studio Vesnyanka ("Веснянка", later upgraded to cinemacenter status), from 1980 till 1984.
In 1984 together with Lina Kurdyukova organized ”ECOANIMA” children studio for ecology and animation (Dnipropetrovsk).
In 1986 together with Lina Kurdyukova and Mariya Krasny founded ”SIMHAH” Center for children and youth creative development at Dnipropetrovsk Jewish Community Center.  
Since 1999 he  has been developing and conducting classes for children with cerebral palsy at Dnipropetrovsk resource center.  Krasny is an ASIFA member and participates in various UNICEF projects.  In 1999 he developed the application of the animation pedagogy for the children with special needs.

Since 2006, Yuri and Lina Krasny have been living in Israel.

Аnimation pedagogy 
Conceptualization of education by means of animation began in 1983, during the Annecy Festival, at an ASIFA seminar titled Animated Film at School - Tomorrow's Pedagogy?. It opened a series of international workshops for children, taking place around the world on a regular basis . The stated goal was 1) popularization of animation making among the children and 2) exposure of the animation made by children to a broad audience (ibid).

While addressing this event in his book animation pedagogy (which he co-authored with Lina Krasny, wife),  Krasny emphasized that animation has both value as a medium for teaching special subjects at school and, not less important, as a means of universal aesthetic development for children and youth of any age group.

It was specified that animation is uniquely close to the child's gaming psychology and, depending on personal interest of the child, it allows to make contact with numerous kinds of human activities, thus facilitating future professional identification. Besides, teaching animation gives necessary grounds of artistic (graphics, painting, sculpting, drama, literature, crafts) and media literacy; essentials of camera work and editing give the pupils communication with the best of the cinema culture and, conversely, develop a critical attitude towards commercial media production.

On the theoretical level, the cycle of 6 components (word, line, color, volume, movement, sound) was formulated, corresponding to the main stages of filmmaking. The children are provided grounds for individual and group work, socialization at animation festivals, in correspondence with three age groups they belong to.

While being highly successful in the 80s (festivals, seminars for the educationalists from the Soviet republics, cooperation with the children workshops in Russia, Estonia, Georgia etc.), animation pedagogy school in Dnipropetrovsk developed as an amator alternative to the official Soviet school system. After the Soviet Union collapse (1991), it continued developing with support of several charitable funds.

Development of home video and simplification of digital editing allowed for application of animation pedagogy methods directly at home. Recently Y. and L. Krasny have been preoccupied with online tutorials for young families.

Animation for the special needs children 
About approaches to work with ”special” children and the experience of such work Y. Krasn itold in his book ”Ar tis Always a Therapy” that was recently published as a second extended edition5.

Below is the excerpt from the synopsis:

”The book describes the experimental teaching of art to children having cerebral palsy and other special needs in the area of psycho physical development that took place during many years. The author attempts to exceed the boundaries of specifically therapeutic objectives as well as to substantiate the potential social value of children having cerebral palsy that is connected with the peculiarities of their creativity. A substantial part of the book is dedicated to a detailed presentation of the techniques and forms of creative classes with children having cerebral palsy and the usage of different materials and methods.
The unique feature of the method is addressing animation creativity as a means of rehabilitation and social adaptation of children having cerebral palsy. Working at an animated film creates unique conditions for organizing cooperation between children with cerebral palsy and healthy children”...

Additional materials in the book “One Hundred Animals in one Palm” on the website https://web.archive.org/web/20150423002509/http://www.prostorebenok.com:80/

Films, made (andbeingmade) in the course of this work are placed on the author's YouTube channel  https://www.youtube.com/channel/UCBumo3sbr1subbFowVrIB9Q

Notes

8.CAN ART AID IN RESOLVING CONFLICTS? 200-201. Amsterdam, 2018.

External links
in English:
  - workshop in Croatia, Škola Animiranog Filma, 2004

in Russian: Креатив-лаборатория Юрия, Лины и Марии Красных
 Арттерапия, творческое развитие, экология детства, разделы Юрия и Лины Красных 
 articles

1946 births
Living people
Russian educators
Soviet educators